This is a list of the most expensive Serbian Footballers

 Dušan Vlahović (Fiorentina->Juventus)85M€
 Nikola Milenković (Partizan->Fiorentina)49M€
 Sergej Milinković-Savić (Genk->Lazio) 35M€
 Predrag Rajković (Reims->Mallorca) 34M€
 Ivan Ilić (Breda->Hellas Verona)25M€
 Filip Kostić (Frankfurt->Juventus) 23M€
 Dušan Tadić (Southampton->Ajax) 22M€
 Aleksandar Mitrović (Newcastle United->FulhamFC) 22M€

Luka Jović (Frankfurt->Fiorentina) 15M€
Saša Lukić (Levante->Torino) 14M€

Strahinja Pavlović (Basel->RedBull Salzburg) 12M€

©Powdered and Made by Djora 2022
Discord Djora#7612

Incoming transfers 

All fees are in European Euros.

References

Football records and statistics in Serbia
Expensive
Serbia